NGC 303 is a lenticular galaxy in the constellation Cetus. It was discovered in 1886 by Francis Leavenworth.

References

0303
?
Cetus (constellation)
Lenticular galaxies
003240